Teresa Michelle Scanlan (born February 6, 1993) is an American beauty pageant titleholder from Gering, Nebraska who was named Miss Nebraska 2010, subsequently winning Miss America 2011 at age 17 and becoming the youngest Miss America since Bette Cooper in 1937. She now works as a business litigation attorney at King & Spalding in Houston, Texas, and serves as a Staff Sargeant in the Wyoming Air National Guard, in the Force Support Squadron.

Biography
Scanlan is of Irish and Croatian ancestry. Her father is from Ireland (Scanlan is an Irish surname) and her maternal grandparents, Frank and Nives Jelich (Jelić), immigrated to the United States from Ilovik, Croatia.

Scanlan was home-schooled until her junior year of high school, before attending Gering High School part-time for half of her junior year. She graduated early from Scottsbluff High School in the spring of 2010 after taking a double load of classes throughout high school.  Teresa was named a Salutatorian for the Scottsbluff class of 2010.  While at Scottsbluff High School, she played the lead role Sharpay Evans in Disney's High School Musical Onstage.  She also participated in choir, show choir, and speech. In 2012, she enrolled as a student at Patrick Henry College.

In her spare time, Scanlan enjoys singing, acting, dancing, playing piano and guitar, composing songs, baking, participating in activities with her local church, and making clothes out of duct tape, among many other hobbies.

In 2018, Scanlan announced she had joined the Air National Guard as an Airman First Class, while continuing her education at UC Berkeley School of Law. She serves as a member of the Wyoming Air National Guard in the 153rd Force Support Squadron. Scanlan graduated from her basic combat training class in the top 10%.

In 2021, Scanlan graduated from UC Berkeley School of Law and joined King & Spalding as a business litigation attorney in their Houston, Texas office.

Pageants

Miss Nebraska 2010

She won the title of Miss Nebraska on June 5, 2010, when she received her crown from outgoing titleholder Brittany Jeffers. Scanlan's platform is “Eating Disorders: A Generation at Risk.” Scanlan's passion to combat eating disorders stems from a friend who struggled with bulimia. Scanlan did research about eating disorders for her friend and discovered how rampant it was across the nation.  She hopes to educate children and adults alike as to the signs and risks of eating disorders, as well as how and where to get help for themselves or a loved one.  Her competition talent was piano. At 17 years of age, she is the youngest Miss Nebraska ever crowned.  After winning the title of Miss Nebraska, Scanlan announced that she was taking a year off from school to fulfill her duties as Miss Nebraska, and that she had deferred enrollment to Patrick Henry College until the fall of 2011.

Miss America 2011

Scanlan was Nebraska's representative at the Miss America 2011 competition held in Las Vegas, Nevada in January 2011.  Her platform for the national pageant was "Eating Disorders: A Generation at Risk."

In the preliminary competition, Scanlan won the talent portion and a $2,000 scholarship for her piano performance of "White Water Chop Sticks."

Scanlan beat out first runner-up Miss Arkansas 2010, Alyse Eady, for the title of Miss America 2011 and was crowned by Miss America 2010 Caressa Cameron on January 15, 2011. With this win she became the first Miss Nebraska ever to claim the Miss America title, as well as the youngest winner in 74 years. Along with the title of Miss America, she also won a $50,000 scholarship. Furthermore, Scanlan was the first titleholder from Nebraska to win Miss America, Miss USA, or Miss Teen USA.

Personal life
On September 6, 2015, Scanlan married Connecticut automobile dealer John Mocadlo, after being engaged for eight months. Mocadlo and Scanlan served ex officio for the Miss Connecticut Scholarship Organization within the Miss America program. In 2016, Scanlan and her husband had a son, and divorced later that same year.

References

External links

Miss America 2011 delegates
1993 births
Living people
People from Gering, Nebraska
American beauty pageant winners
Miss America Preliminary Talent winners
Miss America winners
United States Air Force airmen
Patrick Henry College alumni
UC Berkeley School of Law alumni
American people of Irish descent
American people of Croatian descent